The Operation Golden Fleece was a non-combatant evacuation operation carried out by the Hellenic Navy in August 1993 to evacuate over 1,000 native  Greeks from Georgia fleeing the War in Abkhazia to Greece.

Greeks in Abkhazia

After World War II, ethnic Greeks of the Abkhaz ASSR were deported on Joseph Stalin's order in 1949-1950. They were allowed to return in the late 1950s, however their number never reached pre-deportation level.

Most of the Greeks fled Abkhazia (mostly to Greece and  Russia) during and after the 1992-1993 war so that their number dropped from 14,664 in 1989 to just 1,486 in 2003.

See also

Greek Diaspora

References

External links

Caucasus, 15 years since Operation Golden Fleece
Abkhazia's archive: fire of war, ashes of history
Abkhazia: Cultural Tragedy Revisited

Greek diaspora
Abkhaz–Georgian conflict
1993 in Abkhazia
Golden Fleece
1993 in Greece
August 1993 events in Europe
Georgia (country)–Greece relations
Georgian–Abkhazian conflict